Agni Parthene, rendered "O Virgin Pure" or "O Pure Virgin",
is a Greek Marian hymn (i.e., hymn to the Virgin Mary) composed by St. Nectarios of Aegina in the late 19th century, first published in print in his Theotokarion in 1905.
 
In Orthodox churches, it is considered a paraliturgical hymn and therefore only to be used outside of liturgical services. However, it is often performed by some choirs as a recessional after the conclusion of the Divine Liturgy during the veneration of the cross and receiving of antidoron.

St. Nectarios' poem 
St. Nectarios of Aegina was ordained a Bishop of the Greek Orthodox Church in the late 1800s.  Throughout the period of his episcopacy, he spent much time in prayer and contemplation, and dedicated himself to the monastic life. His spiritual lifestyle, and his particular dedication to the Virgin Mary, inspired him to write a wide variety of religious poetry, much of which was published during his life, and after his death in 1920.

One of the many poems he wrote is "Agni Parthene" or "O Virgin Pure". According to a tradition passed down on the island of Aegina, St. Nectarios reportedly composed the text for this poem after having seen a vision of the Theotokos in a dream where she asked him to record this poem.  The poem was written much like a canon in that it has nine odes.  The original script can still be viewed on his prayer table in his bedroom at this monastery.

It was later published as a poetic hymn for non-liturgical use and private edification in his publication called "Theotokarion of Odes & Hymns for the Most-Holy Theotokos and Ever-Virgin Mary" of 1905, which included many other similar poems.  Additionally, selected verses from the poem including the refrain were set to Byzantine musical notation by the Simonopetra Monastery of Mount Athos in Greece.   The result was the hymn "Virgin Pure" in Byzantine Greek.  The monastery published the work in a book titled Psaltirion Terpnon (Literally, "Hymns from the Psalter").

Contemporary practice 
The hymn, although not used very often in Simonopetra Monastery, nevertheless spread quickly throughout the Eastern Orthodox world and has been translated into many languages including English.  It is most commonly performed as a concert piece in Greece, and as a recessional hymn after liturgical services in parishes throughout the United States. 

The explosion in popularity has been attributed to St. Nectarios of Aegina becoming a popular modern-day saint.

A controversial practice has been the use of the hymn as a communion hymn and as a hymn to begin Vespers services. However, Fr. Gregory and his brethren of Simonopetra Monastery have clarified that although it has become popular, it was never meant to be used liturgically, but rather to be sung only as a non-liturgical religious song for the edification of individuals.

A Church Slavonic version was translated by monks of Valaam Monastery.

A Russian virtual rendition of this hymn was recently performed.

The text is in 24 stanzas or invocations, each followed by the refrain  "Hail, unwedded bride".
The 24 stanzas are arranged into four strophes, each strophe consisting of three tunes iterated twice over.
The first three strophes describe attributes of the Theotokos, while the fourth consists of a prayer for intercession.

Text

The 24 invocations are labelled by strophe (1, 2, 3, 4), tune (A, B, Γ) and iteration (α, β).

 

Church Slavonic translation

Марие, Дево Чистая, Пресвятая Богородице,
Радуйся, Невесто Неневестная.
Царице, Мати Дево, Руно, всех покрывающее,
Радуйся, Невесто Неневестная.
Превысшая Небесных Сил, нетварное сияние,
Радуйся, Невесто Неневестная.
Ликов девичьих Радосте и Ангелов Превысшая,
Радуйся, Невесто Неневестная.
Небес Честная Сило и Свете, паче всех светов,
Радуйся, Невесто Неневестная.
Честнейшая Владычице всех Небесных Воинств,
Радуйся, Невесто Неневестная.
Всех Праотцев Надеждо, пророков Исполнение,
Радуйся, Невесто Неневестная.
В подвизех Ты помоще, Кивоте Бога Слова,
Радуйся, Невесто Неневестная.
И девам Ликование, и матерем Отрадо,
Радуйся, Невесто Неневестная.
Целомудрия Наставнице, душ наших Очищение,
Радуйся, Невесто Неневестная.
Покрове, ширший облака, и страждущих Пристанище,
Радуйся, Невесто Неневестная.
Немощных Покров и Заступнице, Надеждо ненадежных,
Радуйся, Невесто Неневестная.
Марие, Мати Христа, Истиннаго Бога,
Радуйся, Невесто Неневестная.
Ааронов Жезле прозябший, Сосуде тихой радости,
Радуйся, Невесто Неневестная
Всех сирых и вдов Утешение, в бедах и скорбех помоще,
Радуйся, Невесто Неневестная.
Священная и Непорочная Владычице Всепетая,
Радуйся, Невесто Неневестная.
Приклони ко мне милосердие Божественнаго Сына,
Радуйся, Невесто Неневестная.
Ходатаице спасения, припадая, взываю Ти:
Радуйся, Невесто Неневестная.

See also 
Axion Estin
Litany of the Blessed Virgin Mary

References

External links
Αγνή Παρθένε, the Greek text
English translation (with metrical notes)
O Virgin Pure, chanted by the Choir of Simonopetra

Hesychasm
Eastern Christian hymns
Marian hymns